Erachya is a village in Bhatar CD block in Bardhaman Sadar North subdivision of Purba Bardhaman district in the state of West Bengal, India with total 609 families residing.

History
Census 2011 Erachya Village Location Code or Village Code 319860. The village of Erachya is located in the Bhatar tehsil of Burdwan district in West Bengal, India.

Transport 

Population 
Erachya village of Barddhaman has substantial population of Schedule Caste. Schedule Caste (SC) constitutes 25.41% while Schedule Tribe (ST) were 3.17% of total population in Erachya village.

Population and house data

Healthcare
Nearest Rural Hospital at Bhatar (with 60 beds) is the main medical facility in Bhatar CD block. There are primary health centers..

References 

Villages in Purba Bardhaman district